Arcadocypriot, or southern Achaean, was an ancient Greek dialect spoken in Arcadia in the central Peloponnese and in Cyprus. Its resemblance to Mycenaean Greek, as it is known from the Linear B corpus, suggests that Arcadocypriot is its descendant.

In Cyprus the dialect was written using solely the Cypriot Syllabary. The most extensive surviving text of the dialect is the Idalion Tablet. A significant literary source on the vocabulary comes from the lexicon of 5th century AD grammarian Hesychius.

History
Proto-Arcadocypriot (around 1200 BC) is supposed to have been spoken by Achaeans in the Peloponnese before the arrival of Dorians, so it is also called southern Achaean. The isoglosses of the Cypriot and Arcadian dialects testify that the Achaeans had settled in Cyprus. As Pausanias reported:

The establishment happened before 1100 BC. With the arrival of Dorians in the Peloponnese, a part of the population moved to Cyprus, and the rest was limited to the Arcadian mountains.

According to John T Hooker, the preferable explanation for the general historico-linguistic picture is

that in the Bronze Age, at the time of the great Mycenaean expansion, a dialect of a high degree of uniformity was spoken both in Cyprus and in the Peloponnese but that at some subsequent epoch the speakers of West Greek intruded upon the Peloponnese and occupied the coastal states, but made no significant inroads into Arcadia.

Later developments
After the collapse of the Mycenaean world, communication ended, and Cypriot was differentiated from Arcadian. It was written until the 3rd century BC using the Cypriot syllabary.

Tsan was a letter in use only in Arcadia until around the 6th century BC. Arcadocypriot kept many characteristics of Mycenaean, early lost in Attic and Ionic, such as the  sound (digamma).

Glossary

Arcadian

Cypriot
 abathôn  teacher (Attic didaskalos)
 abaristan 'effeminate'
 abartai  birds, volatile (Attic hai ptênai, ta ptêna )
 ablax 'brightly wonderful' (Attic  lambrôs) (α + βλάξ (blax) "idiot", blapto "harm")
 abremês , 'unworthy of being seen, despicable'
 hagana and agana (Attic  sagênê  'dragnet')
 (agan thes) (Attic  siôpa, 'shut up' ( "too much" + "put" (tithemi imp.)
 ankura (Attic τριώβολον triôbolon, "three obols") (Attic ankura anchor)
 aglaon (Attic  glaphyron, "smooth, sweet, simple, decorated" (Cretan also), (Attic: aglaos  "bright")
 agor eagle (Attic  aetos)
 anchoûros  near the morning  (from anchauros anchi + aurion tomorrow )
 adeios (Attic akathartos), "cleanless, impure" (cf. Attic: adeios, adeia = "fearless, safe", Byzantine and Modern: adeios, adeia = "empty")
 adryon   (ploion dugout canoe) (α + δρῦς)
 athrizein (Attic  rhigoun  to shiver)
 aieis 'you listen' (Attic  akoueis) (aïô only in poetic use)
 aipolos (Koine kapêlos wine-seller) (Attic aipolos  'goatherd') (Attic pôleô sell)
 akeuei (Attic  terei he observes, maintains, keeps order)
  akmôn (Attic ἀλετρίβανος aletribanos plough or pestle) (Attic  anvil, meteor) (Acmon mythology)
 akostê barley  (Attic  krithê ) Cypr. according to Hsch., but Thess. for grain of all kinds according to Sch.Il.6.506.)
 hals (Attic oinos  wine) (Attic  hals sea)
 alabê or alaba (Attic  marile charcoal-ember)   
 aleipterion (Attic  grapheion writing utensil or place of writing and engraving) (Attic  aleiphô smear, rub)
  aleuron grave (Attic  taphos )(leuros smooth, level, even )(Attic  wheat flour)
 aloua gardens (Attic  kêpoi)
 halourga the red things of the sea  Cypr. according to Hsch.
 anda she (Attic  hautê)
 aoron lever μοχλός  gateway  door-keeper  (Aeolic aoros unsleeped)
 aoumata chaffs, straws left-overs of barleys  (Cf. loumata, lumata)
  apelyka (Attic  aperrhoga I am broken, crashed)
 aplanê  many, a lot (Attic ) (Laconian ameremera) (Attic aplaneis unmoving, non wandering esp. for stars)
 apoairei (Attic  apokathairei he cleans, removes) ( lead off, set out to sea)
 apogeme imp. remove out, draw off liquor(Attic  aphelke) (Attic  gemô to be full of)
 apoloisthein to finish complete (Attic  apotelein)( holos whole)
 apolugma denudation (Attic  apogymnôsis)(cf. apolouma)
 aras epispeirai Cypriot cursing custom sowing barley with water 
 arizos grave (Attic taphos) (α +  rhiza root)
 armula shoes (Attic  hypodemata)
 armôatos (Attic  spasmos spasm)
 aroura 'heap of wheat with straws'  (Homeric, Ionic  aroura earth)
 arpix harpix or aprix acanthus "species of thorn",  (Attic aprix fast, tight)
 augaros (Attic  asôtos unsaved, wasteful, prodigal)
 auekizein (Attic  sphakelizein produce gangrene)
 Achaiomanteis seers, priests in Cyprus (Hesychius)
 ballai (Attic  bathmoi grades, steps, stages) (Aeolic arrows)
 blasta (Attic  blastesis Vegetation)
 bomboia (Attic  kolumbas elaia pickled olive, swimming in brine)(Attic kolumbaô  dive, swim)
 borborizei  it groans, pollutes
 boukanê anemone flower  (bukanê trumpet)
 bounos  (Attic  stibas bed of straw, reeds, leaves) (Koine bounos hill, mountain)
 boôneta (Attic 'purchased things in the price of cows')  (Cypriot unholy things)
 brenthix (Attic  thridakine lettuce)
 brinka small (Attic   mikron)
 brimazein orgasmize  (Brimô mythology) (brimaomai freak, be enraged)
 brouka green locust  (Ionic broukos)
 brouchetos frog (Attic  bathrachos)  (Hsch. brouchetos pit )
 byblioi gravekeepers
 ganos garden pl. ganea (Hebrew gan 'garden')
 gemois nu lit."you may be full, filled now" Hsch.  take and sit
 genesis libation (Attic  sponde)
 goanai (Attic  klaiein to cry) (goaô moan)
 gra  or grasthi "eat (imp)"  (Attic  phage) (Attic graô gnaw) (Sanskrit grasate eat) (PIE *gres- devour) (Salaminian kagra kata + graô Koine kataphagas gluttonous)
 damatrizein   "collect the fuits of Demeter"
 dein 'turn'  (Attic στρέφειν strephein (cf. Attic: deo tie)
 diptuon  (Attic  hemimedimnos, a dry measure) (Aeolic kammarpsis)
 diphtheraloiphos elementary teacher  grammatodidaskalos ( aleiphô "smear" + diphthera "goatskin, writing-material, parchment"
 drosos  achreios "needless, useless" (Attic drosos dew)
 dusea (the things around the wall) 
 ear (Attic  haima blood) (Attic  Ear Spring (season))
 Encheios Ἀφροδίτη
 elapsa (Attic  diephtheira I harmed)
 elphos butter (Attic  boutyron)
  enauon  put in, ignite 
 epixa (Attic  ornea birds)
 erountes (Attic  legontes the saying) (Attic erountes the ones who will say)
 eroua walk and rest  (cf. Homeric erôeô)
  estê (Attic  stolê, equipment, garment) (cf. esthês clothing)
  zaei (Attic  it moves and blows) (zaei binei, inire, coïre, of illicit intercourse)
 thates or thutes  manual labourers (Attic  thêtes) (see Timocracy)
 theiοn (Attic  igdion mortar) (Aristophanes  thyeia igdion mortar)
 thibôn (Koine thibis ark, basket) (Hebrew tēbhāh ark, from Egyptian tebt 'box')
 throdax  (Attic  thridax  lettuce)
 thua  flavourings 
 higa shut up (Attic   siôpa) (Cretan iga)
 himonia strap (Attic  himas)
 hin  dat. and acc. of the old pers. Pron. hi (q.v.). in, Arc., Cypr., and Cret. for en (q.v.)
 kalindina intestines (Attic  entera) (PIE: ghel-ond-, ghol-n•d- stomach; bowels) (Homeric cholades) (Macedonian gola)
 kachila flowers (Attic  anthê)
 (Attic  anadendrades climbing vineyards) (Attic kena kenea vain
 kibisis bag (Attic  pêra) (Aetolian kibba)
 killos morning cicada (  tettix proinos) (Hesychius killos donkey)
 Kinyradai priests of Aphrodite 
 kiris  or kirris (cypriotic epithet for Adonis)  (Laconian kirris  lychnos light, lamp)
 kittaris Cypriot Diadem. Kittaroi, the ones who wear it
 kichêtos  the vessel or the substance where the censer(Attic libanôtos) is being dyed 
 kunupisma drink from pomace (stemphyla), i.e. left-overs of pressed grapes.
 lênea or  leina   (Attic  eria wools)
 mopsos  'stain on the clothes' (Attic kêlis ) (Mopsus mythology) (Mopsopia old name of Attica and Attic tales of Euphorion of Chalcis)
 mytha voice (Attic  phonê mythos  mytheomai  speak  narrate)
 mulasasthai cleanse with oil (Attic  smêxasthai  smêchô)
 olinoi   sheaves of barley 
 ortos (Attic  bômos altar)
 ouarai we (Attic  hemeis)
 ouaron  olive oil (Attic  elaion)
 ounon or ounos road (Attic odos) (Koine dromos)
 pesson (Attic  mountain or   village)
 pilnon (Attic  phaion obscure brown,  pelidnon  livid (blue, green/ dark)
 prepon beast (Attic  teras beast)(prepôn -ontos, a fish) (Attic prepon -ntos suitable)
 Pygmaion  Adonis
 rhueina lamb, accusative (Attic  arna)(nom. rhuein, arên from Wrêna)
 si bole?  (Attic ; ti boulei? what do you want?)
 sigunon (Attic  akontion spear)

Paphian

 epicoron (Attic  epikopon) cutting, re-stamped coin (from keirô  and koptô cut)
 es poth' herpes? (Attic  pothen hekeis? where do you come from?) (Attic   herpein to creep, to crawl, move slowly like a serpent
 eutrossesthai (Attic  epistrephesthai return)
  thorande (Attic   exo outside)  thyra door
 hingia one (Cypr. ingia) ( heis) (Cretan itton hen one)
 imitraion (Hsch. hypozoston under-girdle, rope of ship
 impataon (Attic  emblepson look inside -imperative) (Hsch. inkapathaon enkatablepson)
 kabeios young (Attic  neos)
 kablê (Koine  mandalos latch)
  kakkersai (Attic  katakopsai to cut, slay) (kata + keirô cut)
 kalecheo (Attic  katakeiso  lay down -imperative) (Homeric  lechos bed)
 kapataxeis (Attic  katakopseis you will cut, slay)
  karrhaxon (Attic  kataraxon strike -imperative) (kata + arassô
 katereai (Attic kathisa sit)
 kibos (Attic kibôtos ark or  eneos speechless)
 kidnon here (Attic  enthade)
 korza or  korzia   heart ( Attic  kardia ) ( Ionic kardiê )( Homeric kradiê ) ( Aeolic karza )
 kubos saucer bowl dish (Attic  trublion) (Attic kubos cube)
 limên ἀγορά and ( endiatribê delay, abide, stay) (Attic  limên port, harbour)
 mochoi inside (Attic  entos)(cf.muchos innermost part, nook, corner)
 sapithos sacrifice (Attic  thysia)
 sasai to sit (Attic  kathisai) (cf. Poetic thassô sit, thôkos backless throne)
 ses  (Attic  elathes you were hidden, escaped notice see  lanthano)
 sihai to spit (Attic  ptusai to spit, cast out)
 soana (Attic  axinê axe)
  stropa (Attic  astrapê) (Homeric sterope, lightning flash)
 huesi (Koine  stolê "garment", (Attic  amphiesis clothing, Hsch.  huestaka)
 Phapê   Paphia (Paphian  Aphrodite)

See also

Hesychius of Alexandria
Cypriot Greek for the modern variety of Greek spoken on Cyprus

References

Bibliography
A History of Ancient Greek: From the Beginnings to Late Antiquity- Arcado-Cypriot by A.Panayotou
C. M. Bowra Homeric Words in Arcadian Inscriptions
 Yves Duhoux. Introduction aux dialectes grecs anciens. Lounain-la-Neuve: Cabay, 1983 
 Rüdiger Schmitt. Einführung in die griechischen Dialekte. Darmstadt: Wissenschaftliche Buchgesellschaft, 1977 
 Markus Egetmeyer. Le dialecte grec ancien de Chypre. 2 vols., vol. 1: Grammaire; vol. 2: Répertoire des inscriptions en syllabaire chypro-grec. Berlin–NY: De Gruyter, 2010.

Further reading

Bakker, Egbert J., ed. 2010. A companion to the Ancient Greek language. Oxford: Wiley-Blackwell.
Christidis, Anastasios-Phoivos, ed. 2007. A history of Ancient Greek: From the beginnings to Late Antiquity. Cambridge, UK: Cambridge University Press.
Colvin, Stephen C. 2007. A historical Greek reader: Mycenaean to the koiné. Oxford: Oxford University Press.
Horrocks, Geoffrey. 2010. Greek: A history of the language and its speakers. 2nd ed. Oxford: Wiley-Blackwell.
Palmer, Leonard R. 1980. The Greek language. London: Faber & Faber.

 
Varieties of Ancient Greek
Languages of Cyprus
Ancient Cyprus
Ancient Arcadia
Languages attested from the 13th century BC
13th-century BC establishments
Languages extinct in the 3rd century BC
3rd-century BC disestablishments